The Usser Wissberg is a mountain of the Oberhalbstein Alps, overlooking the Avers valley, west of Piz Platta, in the canton of Graubünden.

Panorama

References

External links
 Usser Wissberg on Hikr

Mountains of Graubünden
Mountains of the Alps
Alpine three-thousanders
Mountains of Switzerland
Avers
Ferrera
Surses